Lieutenant Colonel Cecil Harry "Jiggs" Jaeger, OBE  (29 April 1913  – 27 September 1970) was a British military band leader.

Jaeger was born in Elham, Kent, the son of a German father, Heinrich Jaeger, and English mother, Mina Pickering. He joined the King's Own Yorkshire Light Infantry at the age of 14. During World War II, he served  in Italy, Greece and Austria, as the bandmaster of the 4th Hussars.

He appeared as a castaway on the BBC Radio programme Desert Island Discs on 18 November 1968. At that time he was Senior Director of Music in the Brigade of Guards, a post he had held since 1949.

He was an Officer of the Order of the British Empire (OBE).

He died in Richmond upon Thames, aged 57.

Bibliography

References 

1913 births
1970 deaths
People from Elham, Kent
Officers of the Order of the British Empire
King's Own Yorkshire Light Infantry soldiers
4th Queen's Own Hussars officers
British Army personnel of World War II
British people of German descent
British military musicians